John Abbott Pringle (May 4, 1892 – November 26, 1962) was an Ontario farmer, merchant and political figure. He represented Addington in the Legislative Assembly of Ontario from 1943 to 1955 as a Progressive Conservative member.

He was born in Arden, Ontario, the son of William James Pringle. In 1919, he married Flora Amelia Lee. Pringle sold hardware and owned a farm. He served on the local school board and was its chairman for 6 years. He was a member of the Orange Order, the Masonic Order and a Shriner. He died suddenly after surgery for an unspecified illness in 1962.

References 

 Canadian Parliamentary Guide, 1947, PG Normandin

External links 

1892 births
1962 deaths
Progressive Conservative Party of Ontario MPPs